Dolichopteryx anascopa is a species of fish found in the sub-Antarctic waters of the Atlantic Ocean, also known from the Indian Ocean and Southeast Pacific Ocean.

Size

References 

Opisthoproctidae
Fish of the Atlantic Ocean
Fish of the Indian Ocean
Fish of the Pacific Ocean
Fish described in 1901
Taxa named by August Brauer